Johannes Riepenhausen (1787, Göttingen - 11 September 1860, Rome) and his older brother Franz  Riepenhausen (1786, Göttingen - 3 January 1831, Rome) were German painters and engravers who worked in Rome.

Biography
The brothers were sons and pupils of Ernst Ludwig Riepenhausen (1765–1840) who was known through engravings he did of William Hogarth's work. In 1804, the brothers studied under Anton Wilhelm Tischbein at the Academy in Kassel, then in Dresden, and in 1807 went in Tieck's company to Rome, where they settled permanently and devoted themselves chiefly to the study of Raphael's works.

Collective works

Besides many religious paintings the brothers produced conjointly the “Glorification of Raphael”, and for the Guelph Hall at Hanover “Henry the Lion Protecting Frederick Barbarossa Against the Romans”. They also collaborated in drawings to Goethe's Faust, in episodes from the life of Charlemagne, in 14 etchings, illustrating the Life and Death of Saint Genevieve (1806), a Geschichte der Malerei in Italien (History of painting in Italy), with 24 outline drawings after Italian masters before Perugino (1810), and a series of drawings after the paintings of Polygnotus at Delphi, according to Pausanias.

Johannes' solo works
After the death of Franz, Johannes published a Vita di Raffaello in 14 plates, for which the brothers had composed drawings together, and also executed several large paintings such as “Raphael's Death” (1836), “Destruction of the Cenci Family” (1839), and others.

Notes

References
  This work in turn cites:
 Andresen, Die deutschen Maler-Radirer des neunzehnten Jahrhunderts (Leipzig, 1872)

1787 births
1860 deaths
19th-century German painters
19th-century German male artists
German male painters
German engravers
Artists from Rome